Brodiaea filifolia, known by the common name threadleaf brodiaea, is a rare species of flowering plant in the cluster-lily genus . It is endemic to southern California, mostly in the region around the junction of Orange, Riverside, and San Diego Counties.

The bulb is a resident of scattered remaining vernal pool and grassland habitats. It is a federally listed threatened species and it is listed as an endangered species on the state level.

Description
Brodiaea filifolia is a perennial producing an inflorescence 20 to 30 centimeters tall which bears bright purple flowers. Each flower has six spreading tepals 1 to 1.5 centimeters long with a center containing three stamens and narrow or small staminodes, which are flat sterile stamens lying against the tepals.

Conservation
This plant occurs in grassland areas, often in floodplains, and it is a member of the local vernal pool flora. It requires heavy clay soils. This type of habitat is becoming very rare as it is being cleared for development, especially as residential areas expand. Undeveloped land near residential areas is degraded by exotic vegetation, mowing and other fire suppression efforts, sewage dumping, grazing of livestock, off-road vehicle use, and other processes.

The plant is also at risk for reduced genetic variability. It often reproduces vegetatively by producing new corms, a method of cloning which does not produce individuals with new combinations of genes. When the plant does reproduce sexually, it requires unrelated individuals which have different genes; it cannot fertilize itself, nor can it successfully reproduce with closely related individuals. Small population sizes that have low genetic diversity and wide distances between populations make it less likely the plant will successfully undergo sexual reproduction. The plant sometimes hybridizes with Brodiaea orcuttii.

There are about 68 occurrences remaining in widely spaced locations between the San Gabriel Mountains and west-central San Diego County. Several occurrences have been discovered since the plant joined the endangered species list, including locations on Camp Pendleton, and a few have been extirpated.

References

External links

Jepson Manual Treatment
USDA Plants Profile
Flora of North America
USFS Wildflowers
Photo gallery

filifolia
Endemic flora of California
Natural history of the California chaparral and woodlands
Natural history of the Peninsular Ranges
NatureServe imperiled species
Threatened flora of California